Eriksberg can refer to:

 Eriksberg, Gothenburg in Gothenburg, Sweden
 Eriksbergs Mekaniska Verkstad, a shipbuilding company existing in Gothenburg from 1850 to 1979
 Eriksberg, Botkyrka in Botkyrka Municipality, Sweden